Ashraful Islam is a Bangladesh Awami League politician and the former Member of Parliament of Rajshahi-16.

Career
Islam was elected to parliament from Rajshahi-16 as an Awami League candidate in 1973.

Death
Islam died on 8 March 1991.

References

Awami League politicians
1991 deaths
1st Jatiya Sangsad members
Year of birth missing